Lima  is a village in Adams County, Illinois, United States.  It is part of the Quincy, IL–MO Micropolitan Statistical Area. As of the 2020 census, the population was 148.

History
Lima was platted in 1833, the year that the first store was established in the village, by Dr. Joseph Orr.  Orr named the village Lima after Lima, Peru, on the suggestion of a Peruvian friend.  In 1839 a large number of Latter-day Saints settled at this location. An LDS stake was organized here in 1840 and a conference here in 1841 had more than 400 Latter-day Saints presence. The Latter-day Saints left in 1845 due to mob violence.

As of 1955, Lima was the principal community of Lima Township, Illinois.

Geography
Lima is located at  (40.178095, -91.376783), along Illinois State Route 96.

Demographics

As of the 2020 census there were 148 people, 48 households, and 38 families residing in the village. The racial makeup of the village was 95.95% White and 4.05% from two or more races. Hispanic or Latino of any race were 2.03% of the population.

There were 48 households, out of which 22.92% had children under the age of 18 living with them, 68.75% were married couples living together, 6.25% had a female householder with no husband present, and 20.83% were non-families. 16.67% of all households were made up of individuals, and 10.42% had someone living alone who was 65 years of age or older. The average household size was 2.34 and the average family size was 2.19.

The village's age distribution consisted of 12.4% under the age of 18, 2.9% from 18 to 24, 27.6% from 25 to 44, 33.4% from 45 to 64, and 23.8% who were 65 years of age or older. The median age was 53.7 years. For every 100 females, there were 69.4 males. For every 100 females age 18 and over, there were 70.4 males.

The median income for a household in the village was $58,750, and the median income for a family was $66,250. Males had a median income of $35,938 versus $24,583 for females. The per capita income for the village was $28,376. No families and 1.9% of the population were below the poverty line.

References

Villages in Adams County, Illinois
Quincy, Illinois micropolitan area
Villages in Illinois
1833 establishments in Illinois
Populated places established in 1833